Iwanaga (written: 岩永) is a Japanese surname. Notable people with the surname include:

, Japanese model and actor
, Japanese politician
, Japanese politician
, Japanese badminton athlete
, Japanese voice actor

Japanese-language surnames